The Journal of the Korean Physical Society is a peer-reviewed scientific journal published by  Springer Science+Business Media on behalf of the Korean Physical Society. The journal publishes 24 issues per year and past issues from 1968-2011 are available as open access. The editor-in-chief is Kong-Ju-Bock Lee. The journal covers original research in all areas of physics. For example, coverage encompasses statistical physics, condensed matter physics and particle physics. Publishing formats include regular full papers, letters, and brief sections. Editors choose featured articles for the journal.

Abstracting and indexing
 Science Citation Index
 Scopus 
 Astrophysics Data System
 Current Contents/Physical, Chemical and Earth Sciences
 GeoRef
 INIS Atomindex

See also
List of physics journals
Journal of the Korean Astronomical Society

External links 
 
 Korean Physical Society

Biweekly journals
English-language journals
Publications established in 1968
Springer Science+Business Media academic journals
Physics journals